Philippe Jean-Charles Jourdan (born 30 August 1960) is a prelate of the Catholic Church who has been Apostolic Administrator of Estonia since 2005.

Biography
Philippe Jourdan was born in Dax, France, on 30 August 1960. His family is of Basque origin. After his secondary education in Dax and preparatory classes at the Lycée Louis-le-Grand in Paris, he earned a degree in engineering at the École nationale des ponts et chaussées in Paris in 1983. He obtained his doctorate in philosophy at the Pontifical University of the Holy Cross in 1987. He was ordained a priest of the Priestly Society of the Holy Cross and Opus Dei by Cardinal Bernard Francis Law on 20 August 1988.

He then practised his ministry as a chaplain at schools and student residences, first in Madrid in 1988–89, then in Paris from 1989 to 1993. He also assisted with parish duties and taught philosophy from 1989 to 1995.

In 1996, he was appointed Vicar General of the Apostolic Administration of Estonia, then the highest resident Church official in the country, within the jurisdiction of the Apostolic Nuncio to Lithuania. From 1999 to 2001 Jourdan served also as a parochial vicar of the Cathedral of Sts. Paul and Peter in Tallinn.

On 23 March 2005 he was appointed titular bishop of Pertusa and Apostolic Administrator of Estonia by Pope John Paul II, becoming the second Catholic bishop in Estonia since the Protestant Reformation in the 16th century. His predecessor, Eduard Profittlich S.J., died in 1942 in a Soviet prison.

He was consecrated a bishop and installed in Tallinn on 10 September 2005 by Archbishop Peter Stephan Zurbriggen, Apostolic Nuncio to the Baltic states. Archbishop Tadevuš Kandrusievič of Moscow and Bishop Javier Echevarría, prelate of Opus Dei, were the co-consecrators. In 2013 he became a member of the Council of European Bishops' Conferences (CCEE), as the representative of Estonia.

He is completing a doctorate in analytical philosophy at the Pontifical University of the Holy Cross.

See also
 Roman Catholicism in Estonia

References

External links
 
 
 

1960 births
Living people
Opus Dei members
20th-century French Roman Catholic priests
21st-century Roman Catholic bishops in Estonia
French expatriates in Estonia
Recipients of the Order of the White Star, 3rd Class